Little Bone 74B is an Indian reserve of the Zagime Anishinabek in Saskatchewan. It is in Townships 23 and 24, Ranges 3 and 4, west of the Second Meridian. In the 2016 Canadian Census, it recorded a population of 24 living in 8 of its 8 total private dwellings.

References

Indian reserves in Saskatchewan
Division No. 5, Saskatchewan
Zagime Anishinabek